The 2013 Chivas USA season was the club's ninth season of existence, and their ninth season in Major League Soccer, the top tier of the American and Canadian soccer pyramids. Chivas USA looked to rebound off a disappointing season, which saw the club finish at the bottom of the Western Conference table.

Background

Transfers

In

Out

Roster

Kits

Friendlies

Competitions

MLS

League table

Results summary

Results by round

Results

U.S. Open Cup

Squad statistics

Appearances and goals

|-
|colspan="14"|Players away from Chivas USA on loan:

|-
|colspan="14"|Players who left Chivas USA during the season:

|}

Goal scorers

Disciplinary record

References 

Chivas USA seasons
Chivas USA
Chivas USA
Chivas USA